Jahiz Khaneh (also Romanized as Jahīz Khāneh; also known as Qeleh Jīz Khaneh) is a village in Tabadkan Rural District, in the Central District of Mashhad County, Razavi Khorasan Province, Iran. At the 2006 census, its population was 101, in 28 families.

References 

Populated places in Mashhad County